Mabel Fonseca Ramírez (born May 8, 1972 in Guantánamo, Cuba) is a retired amateur Puerto Rican freestyle wrestler, who competed in the women's lightweight category. She produced a remarkable tally of four career medals; three of them were bronze from the Pan American Games (2003 and 2007) and World Championships and a silver in the 59-kg division from the 2006 Central American and Caribbean Games. Fonseca also had an opportunity to represent Puerto Rico at the 2004 Summer Olympics, but her participation had been marred by a disqualification for failing the doping test. Throughout her sporting career, Fonseca trained as a member of the women's wrestling team for Esporto San Juan under her personal coach Reinaldo Jimenez.

Fonseca highlighted her wrestling career at the 2002 World Wrestling Championships in Chalcis, Greece, where she picked up a bronze medal in the 59-kg division over France's Sandrine Seve, and then boasted for another one at the 2003 Pan American Games in Santo Domingo, Dominican Republic.

When women's wrestling made its debut at the 2004 Summer Olympics in Athens, Fonseca qualified as a lone wrestler for the Puerto Rican squad in the 55 kg class. Earlier in the process, she chose to drop down her weight class by four kilograms and thereby placed fifth from the 2003 World Wrestling Championships in New York City, New York, United States. In the prelim pool, Fonseca pinned Ukraine's Tetyana Lazareva in her opening match, but fell behind Sweden's Ida-Theres Karlsson with a similar disposition before reaching the minute mark. Despite missing a spot for the semifinals, Fonseca had a chance to edge past U.S. wrestler Tela O'Donnell 10–7, and China's Sun Dongmei 8–6 in overtime during the classification rounds. Fonseca originally claimed the fifth position, but was disqualified from the tournament after being tested positive for stanozolol, allowing other wrestlers behind her to upgrade their rankings.

Upon lifting her two-year suspension from anti-doping violation, Fonseca returned to the wrestling scene, and captured two more medals in the lightweight category at the 2006 Central American and Caribbean Games in Cartagena, Colombia, and at the 2007 Pan American Games in Rio de Janeiro, Brazil. She also vowed to improve her gaming strategy and sought to compete for the 2008 Summer Olympics, but missed a spot from the Olympic Qualification Tournament.

References

External links
 

1972 births
Living people
Puerto Rican female sport wrestlers
Olympic wrestlers of Puerto Rico
Wrestlers at the 2004 Summer Olympics
Wrestlers at the 2003 Pan American Games
Wrestlers at the 2007 Pan American Games
Sportspeople from Guantánamo
Puerto Rican people of Cuban descent
Doping cases in wrestling
World Wrestling Championships medalists
Pan American Games bronze medalists for Puerto Rico
Pan American Games medalists in wrestling
Central American and Caribbean Games silver medalists for Puerto Rico
Competitors at the 2006 Central American and Caribbean Games
Central American and Caribbean Games medalists in wrestling
Medalists at the 2003 Pan American Games
Medalists at the 2007 Pan American Games
Cuban female judoka